Sni-A-Bar Township is an inactive township in Jackson County, in the U.S. state of Missouri.

Sni-A-Bar Township was established in 1834, taking its name from Sni-A-Bar Creek.

The township included Blue Springs, Oak Grove, and the village of Grain Valley.

Further reading
 Missouri atlas (archived), including Jackson County circa 1930

References

Townships in Missouri
Townships in Jackson County, Missouri